Stéphane Bré (born 29 March 1966 in Saint-Brieuc) is a French football referee. He has refereed in the French Football Federation (FFF) since 1992 and has been a FIFA referee since 1998.

Bré has officiated the 2000 Olympic tournament in Sydney. He also served as a referee in qualifiers for the Euro 2000 and 2002 World Cup tournaments.

References

Profile

1966 births
Living people
French football referees
Olympic football referees